This Norman Mailer bibliography lists major books by and about Mailer (January 31, 1923 – November 10, 2007), an American novelist, new journalist, essayist, public intellectual, filmmaker, and biographer. Over a fifty-nine-year period, Mailer won two Pulitzer Prizes and had eleven books spend a total of 160 weeks on the New York Times bestseller list. Mailer's output included forty-plus books and six decades of bestsellers on a wide range of topics, from World War II to Marilyn Monroe. His biographer J. Michael Lennon calls him the chronicler of the American Century, and a talent whose career has "been at once so brilliant, varied, controversial, improvisational, public, productive, lengthy and misunderstood".


Chronological, 1948–2007

Novels

Essays, Nonfiction Narratives

Anthologies, Collections, Miscellanies 
Beginning in 1959, it became a habit of Mailer's to release his periodical writing, excerpts, and the occasional new piece in collections and miscellanies every few years. Not including letters, Mailer had written for over 100 magazines and periodicals, including Dissent, Ladies Home Journal, One: The Homosexual Magazine, Playboy, Esquire, Vanity Fair, Harper's, New Yorker, and others.

Conversations, Interviews 
By 1986, Mailer had been interviewed approximately 200 times, perhaps more than any other American author on a wide range of topics. He very well might maintain that distinction today.

Short stories

Key Texts for Mailer Studies 
Listed chronologically, the following are integral books for the study of Norman Mailer.

 
 
 
 
 
 
 
 .
 
 
 
 
 
 
 
 
 .
 
 .
 
 
 .
 
 
 .
 
 
 
 .
 
 
 
 
 
 
 .

References 
Notes

Citations

Works Cited

 
 
 
 
 
 
 
 
 
 
 
 
 
 
 
 
 

 
Bibliographies of American writers
Postmodern literature bibliographies